Laidi Parish is an administrative unit of Kuldīga Municipality in the Courland region of Latvia. The parish has a population of 1274 (as of 1/07/2010) and covers an area of 114.97 km2.

Villages of Laidi parish 
 Laidi
 Rude
 Sermite
 Valtaiķi
 Vanga

Parishes of Latvia
Kuldīga Municipality
Courland